"Orchis Fatalis" is the third episode of the eighth season of British television show Midsomer Murders and the thirty-eighth episode overall. It stars John Nettles as Detective Chief Inspector Tom Barnaby and John Hopkins as Detective Sergeant Dan Scott. It concerns the discovery of a very rare orchid, the yellow roth, and a number of murders seemingly committed in an attempt to acquire it.

Midsomer Murders episodes
2005 British television episodes